In mathematics, specifically the theory of elliptic functions, the nome is a special function that belongs to the non-elementary functions. This function is of great importance in the description of the elliptic functions, especially in the description of the modular identity of the Jacobi theta function, the Hermite elliptic transcendents and the Weber modular functions, that are used for solving equations of higher degrees.

Definition

The nome function is given by

The nome can be taken to be a function of any one of these quantities; conversely, any one of these quantities can be taken as functions of the nome. Each of them uniquely determines the others when . That is, when , the mappings between these various symbols are both 1-to-1 and onto, and so can be inverted: the quarter periods, the half-periods and the half-period ratio can be explicitly written as functions of the nome. Explicit expressions for the quarter periods, in terms of the nome, are given in the linked article.

The nome is frequently used as a value with which elliptic functions and modular forms can be described; on the other hand, it can also be thought of as function, because the quarter periods are functions of the elliptic modulus : .

The complementary nome  is given by

Sometimes the notation  is used for the square of the nome.

They are defined as follows:

Applications 

The nome solves the following equation:

This analogon is valid for the Pythagorean complementary modulus:

For the complete theta functions these definitions introduced by Sir Edmund Taylor Whittaker and George Neville Watson are valid:

These three definition formulas are written down in the fourth edition of the book A Course in Modern Analysis written by Whittaker and Watson on the pages 469 and 470. The nome is commonly used as the starting point for the construction of Lambert series, the q-series and more generally the q-analogs. That is, the half-period ratio  is commonly used as a coordinate on the complex upper half-plane, typically endowed with the Poincaré metric to obtain the Poincaré half-plane model.  The nome then serves as a coordinate on a punctured disk of unit radius; it is punctured because  is not part of the disk (or rather,  corresponds to ).  This endows the punctured disk with the Poincaré metric.

The tiling is referred to as the modular symmetry given by the modular group. Some functions that are periodic on the upper half-plane are called to as modular functions; the nome, the half-periods, the quarter-periods or the half-period ratio all provide different parameterizations for these periodic functions.

The prototypical modular function is Klein's j-invariant. It can be written as a function of either the half-period ratio τ or as a function of the nome . The series expansion in terms of the nome or the square of the nome (the q-expansion) is famously connected to the Fisher-Griess monster by means of monstrous moonshine.

Euler's function arises as the prototype for q-series in general.

Curve sketching

Every real value  of the interval  is assigned to a real number between inclusive zero and inclusive one in the nome function . The elliptic nome function is axial symmetric to the ordinate axis. Thus:  = . The functional curve of the nome passes through the origin of coordinates with the slope zero and curvature plus one eighth. For the real valued interval  the nome function  is strictly left-curved.

Derivatives

The Legendre's relation is defined that way:

And as described above, the elliptic nome function  has this original definition:

Furthermore, these are the derivatives of the two complete elliptic integrals:

Therefore, the derivative of the nome function has the following expression:

The second derivative can be expressed this way:

And that is the third derivative:

The complete elliptic integral of the second kind is defined as follows:

The following equation follows from these equations by eliminating the complete elliptic integral of the second kind:

Thus, the following third-order quartic differential equation is valid:

MacLaurin series

The MacLaurin series of the nome function  has even exponents and positive coefficients at all positions:

And the sum with the same absolute values of the coefficients but with alternating signs generates this function:

 

The radius of convergence of this Maclaurin series is 1. Here  (OEIS A005797) is a sequence of exclusively natural numbers  for all natural numbers  and this integer number sequence is not elementary. This sequence of numbers  was researched by the Czech mathematician and fairy chess composer Václav Kotěšovec, born in 1956. By edding a further integer number sequence  that denotes a specially modified Apéry sequence (OEIS A036917), the sequence of the Kotěšovec numbers  can be generated. The starting value of the sequence  is the value  and the following values of this sequence are generated with those two formulas that are valid for all numbers :

This formula creates the Kotěšovec sequence too, but it only creates the sequence numbers of even indices:

The Apéry sequence  was researched especially by the mathematicians Sun Zhi-Hong and Reinhard Zumkeller. And that sequence generates the square of the complete elliptic integral of the first kind:

The first numerical values of the central binomial coefficients and the two numerical sequences described are listed in the following table:

Václav Kotěšovec wrote down the number sequence  on the Online Encyclopedia of Integer Sequences up to the seven hundredth sequence number.

Here one example of the Kotěšovec sequence is computed:

{| class="wikitable"
|

|}

Function values

The two following lists contain many function values of the nome function:

The first list shows pairs of values with mutually Pythagorean complementary modules:

The second list shows pairs of values with mutually tangentially complementary modules:

Related quartets of values are shown below:

{| class="wikitable"
|

|-
|

|-
|

|}

Identities

Exponentiation theorems
Every power of a nome of a positive algebraic number as base and a positive rational number as exponent is equal to a nome value of a positive algebraic number:

 

These are the most important examples of the general exponentiation theorem:

 
 
 
 

The abbreviation  stands for the Jacobi elliptic function amplitude sine.

For algebraic  values in the real interval  the shown amplitude sine expressions are always algebraic.

This is the general exponentiation theorem:

That theorem is valid for all natural numbers n.

Reflection theorems

Therefore, these representations have validity for all real numbers x:

Pythagorean opposites:

 

Tangential opposites:

Sums and products

Sum series

The elliptic nome was explored by Richard Dedekind and this function is the fundament in the theory of eta functions and their related functions. The elliptic nome is the initial point of the construction of the Lambert series. In the theta function by Carl Gustav Jacobi the nome as an abscissa is assigned to algebraic combinations of the Arithmetic geometric mean and also the complete elliptic integral of the first kind. Many infinite series can be described easily in terms of the elliptic nome:

 

 

The quadrangle represents the square number of index n, because in this way of notation the two in the exponent of the exponent would appear to small. So this formula is valid: 

The letter  describes the complete elliptic integral of the second kind, which is the quarter periphery of an ellipse in relation to the bigger half axis of the ellipse with the numerical eccentricity  as abscissa value.

Product series

The two most important theta functions can be defined by following product series:

Furthermore, these two Pochhammer products have those two relations:

 
 

The Pochhammer products have an important role in the Pentagonal number theorem and its derivation.

Relation to other functions

Complete elliptic integrals

The nome function can be used for the definition of the complete elliptic integrals of first and second kind:

 

In this case the dash in the exponent position stands for the derivative of the so-called theta zero value function:

Definitions of Jacobi functions

The elliptic functions Zeta Amplitudinis and Delta Amplitudinis can be defined with the elliptic nome function easily:

 
 
 

These three formulas are valid for all values k from −1 until +1.

Then following successive definition of the other Jacobi functions is possible:

 
 

The product definition of the amplitude sine was written down in the essay π and the AGM by the Borwein brothers on page 60 and this formula is based on the theta function definition of Whittaker und Watson.

Identities of Jacobi Amplitude functions

In combination with the theta functions the nome gives the values of many Jacobi amplitude function values:

 

The abbreviation sc describes the quotient of the amplitude sine divided by the amplitude cosine.

Quintic equations

Solution formula with the nome
	
According to the Abel-Ruffini theorem, the general case of the fifth-degree equations cannot be solved by elementary root expressions. But with a combination of the nome, the theta function and the two Rogers-Ramanujan continued fractions R and S, all quintic equations with real coefficients can be solved. For the following quintic polynomial in Bring-Jerrard normal form, the real solution with the mentioned elliptic functions is represented as follows:
	

	
The real solution for all real values  can be worked out that way:
	
 
	
 
	
 
	
If the coefficient w is real, then only one real solution exists for the Bring-Jerrard equation shown above, and this solution is the solution just mentioned. All regular quintic equations can be transformed into Bring-Jerrard form by solving cubic equations. Only the quintic, linear, and absolute terms are present in the Bring-Jerrard form, but the quartic, cubic, and quadratic terms are not contained in this form. The following defining identities are now valid for the applied elliptic functions. The mathematician Charles Hermite found out the value of the elliptic modulus k in relation to the coefficient of the abolute term of the Bring-Jerrard-Form. In his essay Sur la résolution de l'Équation du cinquiéme degré Comptes rendus described the computation method for the elliptic modulus in relation to the absolute term. The Italian version of his essay Sulla risoluzione delle equazioni del quinto grado contains a formula on page 258, that can be solved directly for the elliptic modulus:

The same value of k can be expressed in an even easier was by taking the hyperbolic lemniscate functions:

These hyperbolic lemniscate functions are explained in the following section.

Important function definitions

The lemniscate functions and the hyperbolic lemniscate functions have these definitions:

 
 
 
 
 
 
 

The letter G represents the Gauss constant, which can be expressed by the gamma function in the way just shown.

 

The square of the Hyperbolic lemniscate cotangent from the half of the Hyperbolic lemniscate areacosine has this algebraic identity:

 

And for following combination of Lemniscate sine und Areacosinus Lemniscatus Hyperbolicusand Hyperbolic lemniscate areacosine this algebraic identity is valid:

 

The shown Rogers-Ramanujan continued fractions R and S have those definitions:

	
Further identical definitions for the Rogers-Ramanujan functions:
	
 
	
 
	
 
	
 
	

	
The double bracket in the two entries again describe the Nome Pochhammer symbol:

Calculation example
	
For example:
	
 
	
This equation has that real solution:
	
 
	
 
	
 
	
Approximated values:

Historical derivation of the quintic solution
	
This formula is based on the parameter identity found out by John Stuart Glashan, George Paxton Young and Carl Runge during the second half of the 19th century, that can be described by following equation triplet:
	
 
	
 
	
 
	
Corresponding elliptic key:

First derivative of the theta function

Derivation of the derivative

The first derivative of the principal theta function among the Jacobi theta functions can be derived in the following way using the chain rule and the derivation formula of the elliptic nome:

 

 

Because the now mentioned modular identity between the theta function and the elliptic integral of the first kind is valid:

 

Therefore, this equation results:

 

The complete elliptic integrals of the second kind have that identity:

 

Along with this modular identity, following formula transformation can be made:

 

Furthermore, this identity is valid:

 

By using the theta function expressions 00(x) and 01(x) following representation is possible:

 

This is the final result:

Related first derivatives
In a similar way following other first derivatives of theta functions and their combinations can also be derivated:

Important definition:

References

 Milton Abramowitz and Irene A. Stegun, Handbook of Mathematical Functions, (1964) Dover Publications, New York.  .  See sections 16.27.4 and 17.3.17.  1972 edition: 
 Tom M. Apostol, Modular Functions and Dirichlet Series in Number Theory, Second Edition (1990), Springer, New York 
 Folkmar Bornemann, Dirk Laurie, Stan Wagon and Jörg Waldvogel, Vom Lösen numerischer Probleme, page 275
 Edmund Taylor Whittaker and George Neville Watson: A Course in Modern Analysis, 4th ed. Cambridge, England: Cambridge University Press, 1990. page 469–470.
 Toshio Fukushima: Fast Computation of Complete Elliptic Integrals and Jacobian Elliptic Functions. 2012, National Astronomical Observatory of Japan (国立天文台)
 Lowan, Blanch and Horenstein: On the Inversion of the q-Series Associated with Jacobian Elliptic Functions. Bull. Amer. Math. Soc. 48, 1942
 H. Ferguson, D. E. Nielsen, G. Cook: A partition formula for the integer coefficients of the theta function nome. Mathematics of computation, Volume 29, number 131, Juli 1975
 J. D. Fenton and R. S. Gardiner-Garden: Rapidly-convergent methods for evaluating elliptic integrals and theta and elliptic functions. J. Austral. Math. Soc. (Series B) 24, 1982, page 57
 Charles Hermite: Sur la résolution de l'Équation du cinquiéme degré Comptes rendus. Acad. Sci. Paris, Nr. 11, 1858
 Nikolaos Bagis: On the solution of the general quintic using the Rogers-Ramanujan continued fraction. Pella, Makedonien, Griechenland, 2015
 Nikolaos Bagis: Solution of Polynomial Equations with Nested Radicals. Pella, Makedonien, Griechenland, 2020
 Viktor Prasolov (Прасолов) und Yuri Solovyev (Соловьёв): Elliptic Functions and Elliptic Integrals. Volume 170, Rhode Island, 1991. pages 149 – 159
 Sun Zhi-Hong: New congruences involving Apery-like numbers. Huaiyin Normal University, Huaian (淮安), China, 2020. page 2
 Robert Fricke: Die elliptischen Funktionen und ihre Anwendungen: Dritter Teil. Springer-Verlag Berlin Heidelberg, 2012. ISBN 978-3-642-20953-6, ISBN 978-3-642-20954-3 (eBook)
 Adolf Kneser: Neue Untersuchung einer Reihe aus der Theorie der elliptischen Funktionen. J. reine u. angew. Math. 157, 1927. pages 209 – 218
 G. P. Young: Solution of Solvable Irreducible Quintic Equations, Without the Aid of a Resolvent Sextic. In: Amer. J. Math. Band 7, pages 170–177, 1885.
 C. Runge: Über die auflösbaren Gleichungen von der Form x 5 + u x + v = 0 {\displaystyle x^{5}+ux+v=0} x^{5}+ux+v=0. In: Acta Math. Band 7, pages 173–186, 1885, doi:10.1007/BF02402200.
 Edward Neuman: Two-sided inequalitites for the lemniscate functions. Volume 1, Southern Illinois University Carbondale, USA, 2014.
 Ji-en Deng und Chao-ping Chen: Sharp Shafer-Fink type inequalities for Gauss lemniscate functions. Universität Henan (河南大学), China, 2014.
 Jun-Ling Sun und Chao-ping Chen: Shafer-type inequalities for inverse trigonometric functions and Gauss lemniscate functions. Universität Henan, China, 2016.
 Minjie Wei, Yue He and Gendi Wang: Shafer–Fink type inequalities for arc lemniscate functions. Zhejiang Sci-Tech University, Hangzhou, China, 2019

Elliptic functions